Kodai Mazhai is a 1986 Indian Tamil-language film, directed by Muktha S. Sundar and produced by V. Ramasami. The film stars Vidhyasree, with Lakshmi, Jaishankar and Sripriya in supporting roles. It was released on 26 September 1986.

Plot

Cast 

Sunitha as Vidhya
Lakshmi
Jaishankar
Sripriya
Prasad
Manorama
Loose Mohan
S. Ve. Sekhar
Senthil
Thengai Srinivasan
Amala
Bhagyaraj
Saritha
Charle
Master Nagesh
Baby Vijayapriya
 Rajinikanth in a guest appearance

Production 
Kodai Mazhai, the directorial debut of Muktha S. Sundar, was one of the earliest South Indian films to have scenes shot in low light, following the introduction of high-speed negative film in India the mid-1980s. It was the feature film debut of Sunitha, who later became known as "Kodai Mazhai Vidya". The dialogues were written by Komal Swaminathan.

Soundtrack 
Soundtrack was composed by Ilaiyaraaja and lyrics were by Vaali, Na. Kamarasan, Pulamaipithan and Mu. Metha. The song "Kaatrodu Kuzhalin" is set in Simhendramadhyamam raga.

Release and reception 
Kodai Mazhai was released on 26 September 1986. Jayamanmadhan of Kalki wrote there have already been films in Tamil about vibrant artistes with dreams in their eyes and dancing on their feet, but without mixing love and lust is what makes the film special.

References

External links 
 

1980s Tamil-language films
1986 directorial debut films
1986 films
Films scored by Ilaiyaraaja